A number of ships have been named Rainbow, including:

 , a Greek coaster in service 1967–77
 , a Cypriot cargo ship in service 1967–74

Ship names